Gülnar is a district of Mersin Province of Turkey,  south-west of the city of Mersin.

Geography
Gülnar is a small town  providing high schools and other basic amenities to the surrounding villages.(Town population. 8 357) The road from central Anatolia to Anamur on the Mediterranean coast passes through here, one of the windiest roads imaginable, making Gulnar a remote district indeed.

Much of the cultivated area is vineyards, other important crops are grains and chick peas. The high meadows are used for summer grazing.

History
The area has been occupied since the time of the Hittites, and was later settled by the Assyrians, Persians, Egyptians, Greeks, Romans and Armenians. The people of Gülnar today are descendants of the Turkmen tribes that came here from Central Asia in the 13th century. (Among older generation of Turkmens Gülnar is usually named as Anaypazarı )

See also
Gülnar Hatun

References

Populated places in Mersin Province
Districts of Mersin Province
Populated places in Gülnar District